Baptista is a Portuguese surname.

People with this name include:

Alba Baptista (born 1997)
Alexandre Baptista (born 1941), Portuguese footballer
Ana Filipa Baptista (born 1990), Portuguese chess player
António Maria Baptista (1866–1920), Portuguese military officer and politician
Arnaldo Baptista (born 1948), Brazilian rock musician
Baptista Mantuanus (1447–1516), Italian Carmelite reformer, humanist, and poet
Baptista Minola, a character in Shakespeare's Taming Of The Shrew
Baptista Varani (1458–1527), Italian nun and Catholic saint
Christopher Baptista, Canadian drag queen
Cyro Baptista (born 1950), Brazilian musician
 (born 1962), Brazilian botanist
Eduardo Baptista (born 1970), Brazilian football manager
Ezequiel Baptista (born 1926), Portuguese footballer
Felipe Oliveira Baptista (born 1975), Portuguese fashion designer
Firmino Baptista, Portuguese athlete
Hélder Baptista (born 1972), Portuguese footballer
Joao Luiz Ferreira Baptista (born 1971), Brazilian footballer
Jorge Carlos Santos Moreira Baptista (born 1977), Portuguese footballer
Joseph Baptista (1864–1930), Indian-freedom activist known as Kaka Baptista
Juan Alfonso Baptista (born 1976), Venezuelan actor and model
Júlio Baptista (born 1981), Brazilian footballer
Mariano Baptista (1832-1907), President of Bolivia
Mawete João Baptista, Angolan ambassador
Miguel Baptista (born 1993) Portuguese footballer
Nelsinho Baptista (born 1950), Brazilian football player and manager
Pedro Ernesto Baptista (fl. 1931–1936), Brazilian surgeon and politician
Pedro Tiago Pereira Baptista (born 1992), Portuguese footballer
Serafim Baptista (born 1925), Portuguese footballer
Silverio Pinto Baptista (born 1969), East Timorese ombudsman
Vítor Baptista (1948–1999), Portuguese footballer

See also
 Baptist (surname)
 Baptiste (name) (French surname and given name) French term meaning "Baptist"
 Battista (Italian surname) Italian term meaning "Baptist"
 Bautista (Spanish surname) Spanish term meaning "Baptist"
 Batista (Portuguese/Spanish surname)

Portuguese-language surnames